The 2022–23 Országos Bajnokság I (also known as the E.ON Férfi OB I Bajnokság for sponsorship reasons, OB I in short), is going to be the 117th season of top-tier water polo in Hungary. A total of fourteen teams contest this season's league, which began on 8 October 2022 and will conclude on 18 May 2023.

Teams

The following 14 clubs compete in the OB I during the 2022–23 season:

See also
2022 Magyar Kupa

References

External links
 Hungarian Water Polo Federaration 

Seasons in Hungarian water polo competitions
Hungary
Orszagos Bajnoksag I Men
Orszagos Bajnoksag I Men